Rozyna Małgorzata von Eckenberg (1625–1648), was a Polish court official.

She was the daughter of NN von Eckenberg and Margarethe von Toll. She came to Poland as a lady-in-waiting to the new queen of Poland, Cecilia Renata of Austria, and was appointed governess to Sigismund Casimir.  Between the death of Cecilia and the next marriage of the king, she was mistress of Władysław IV Vasa from 1644 to 1646. She married Michał Jerzy Czartoryski.

References

 Ochmann-Staniszewska S., Dynastia Wazów w Polsce, Wydawnictwo Naukowe PWN, Warszawa 2006, s. 271, 273.

17th-century Polish people
1648 deaths
Polish ladies-in-waiting
Royal governesses
Mistresses of Polish royalty
1625 births
Date of birth unknown
Date of death unknown